Afsabad may refer to:
 Afsabad, Khvaf
 Afsabad, Rashtkhvar